The following is a list of Japanese television programs by date of first broadcast in Japan. For an alphabetical list, see: List of Japanese television series.

1960s

1960
February 1 – Tetsujin 28-go

1961
April 3 – Minna no Uta
 May 1 – Instant History

1962
June 25 – Otogi Manga Calendar

1963
January 1 – Astro Boy
September 4 – Sennin Buraku
October 20 – Tetsujin 28-go
November 7 – 8 Man

1964
June 7 – Shōnen Ninja Kaze no Fujimaru
August 3 – Big X

1965
April 4 – Dolphin Prince
May 8 – Space Ace
June 3 – Prince Planet
June 6 – The Amazing 3
August 29 – Obake no Q-tarō
October 6 – Kimba the White Lion

1966
February 5 – Osomatsu-kun
March 7 – Marude Dameo
October 1 – Robotan
October 5 – New Jungle Emperor: Go Ahead Leo!
October 6 – Hang On! Marine Kid
December 5 – Sally the Witch
December 31 – King of the World: The King Kong Show
 Leo the Lion
 Ninja Hattori-kun Ninja Hattori-kun + Ninja Monster Jippou

1967
January 7 – Gokū no Daibōken
April 1 – Ōgon Bat
April 2 – Perman
April 2 – Princess Knight
April 2 – Speed Racer
April 5 – King Kong & 001/7 Tom Thumb
October 7 – Oraa Guzura Dado

1968
January 3 – GeGeGe no Kitarō
March 30 – Star of the Giants
April 5 – Cyborg 009
April 21 – Kaibutsu-kun
October 2 – Dokachin the Primitive Boy
October 3 – Sabu to Ichi Torimono Hikae
October 7 – Yōkai Ningen Bem

1969
January 6 – Himitsu no Akko-chan
January 13 – Undersea Boy Marine
April 2 – Judo Boy
April 4 – Mōretsu Atarō
April 6 – Dororo
April 6 – Kamui the Ninja
October 2 – Tiger Mask
October 5 – The Genie Family
October 5 – Moomin
October 5 – Sazae-san
October 7 – Flower Action 009ノ1
December 7 – Attack No. 1

1970s

1970
April 1 – Ashita no Joe
April 7 – The Adventures of Hutch the Honeybee
April 13 – Akaki Chi no Eleven
October 4 – Inakappe Taishō
October 5 – Norakuro
November 2 – Mahō no Mako-chan

1971
January 1 – Hyppo and Thomas
January 3 – Andersen Monogatari
January 5 – Daichūshingura
April 8 – Wandering Sun
September 25 – Tensai Bakabon
October 3 – Marvelous Melmo
October 4 – Sarutobi Ecchan
October 7 – GeGeGe no Kitarō
October 24 – Lupin The Third Part I
September 1 – Shin Obake no Q-tarō

1972
January 4 – Pinocchio: The Series
January 9 – New Moomin
April 1 – Triton of the Sea
April 3 – Mahōtsukai Chappy
July 8 – Devilman
October 1 – Science Ninja Team Gatchaman
October 4 – Astroganger
October 5 – Tamagon the Counselor
October 7 – Dokonjō Gaeru
December 3 – Mazinger Z

1973
January 1 – Babel II
January 2 – Demetan Croaker, The Boy Frog
January 7 – Fables of the Green Forest
April 1 – Doraemon
April 2 – Little Wansa
September 24 – Edo o Kiru
October 1 – Miracle Girl Limit-chan
October 2 – Casshan
October 3 – Karate Baka Ichidai
October 4 – Dororon Enma-kun
October 5 – Aim for the Ace!
October 13 – Cutie Honey

1974
January 6 – Heidi, Girl of the Alps
April 1 – Chargeman Ken!
April 1 – Majokko Megu-chan
April 2 – Dame Oyaji
April 3 – Vicky the Viking
April 4 – Getter Robo
April 4 – New Honeybee Hutch
April 5 – Hoshi no Ko Chobin
September 8 – Great Mazinger
October 4 – Ganbare!! Robocon
October 4 – Hurricane Polymar
October 5 – First Human Giatrus
October 6 – The Song of Tentomushi
October 6 – Space Battleship Yamato
October 15 – Calimero

1975
January 5 – Dog of Flanders
April 1 – Maya the Honey Bee
April 4 – Brave Raideen
April 4 – La Seine no Hoshi
April 5 – Don Chuck Monogatari
April 7 – Ganba no Bōken
May 15 – Getter Robo G
July 2 – Tekkaman: The Space Knight
October 1 – Arabian Nights: Sinbad's Adventures
October 3 – Kum-Kum
October 4 – Time Bokan
October 5 – Grendizer
October 5 – Steel Jeeg
October 6 – The Adventures of Pepero
October 6 – Ganso Tensai Bakabon
October 7 – Laura, the Prairie Girl
October 15 – Ikkyū-san

1976
January 2 – Huckleberry no Bōken
January 4 – 3000 Leagues in Search of Mother
April 1 – Gaiking
April 4 – Gowappa 5 Gōdam
April 6 – UFO Warrior Dai Apolon
April 17 – Chōdenji Robo Combattler V
April 27 – Piccolino no Bōken
July 1 – Groizer X
July 5 – Blocker Gundan 4 Machine Blaster
September 5 – Magne Robo Gakeen
October 1 – Candy Candy
October 1 – Hoka Hoka Kazoku
October 3 – Little Lulu and Her Little Friends
October 3 – Paul's Miraculous Adventure
October 6 – Dokaben

1977
January 1 – Time Bokan Series Yatterman
January 2 – Rascal the Raccoon
February 3 – Jetter Mars
March 3 – Mechander Robo
March 6 – Wakusei Robo Danguard Ace
March 18 – Daitetsujin 17
April 3 – Ganbaron
April 4 – Attack on Tomorrow
April 9 – Chōgattai Majutsu Robo Ginguiser
June 4 – Chōdenji Machine Voltes V
June 7 – Monarch: The Big Bear of Tallac
July 3 – Chojin Sentai Barattack
September 18 – Ippatsu Kanta-kun
September 22 – Arrow Emblem: Hawk of the Grand Prix
October 1 – Shin Kyoujin no Hoshi
October 1 – Temple the Balloonist
October 2 – Nobody's Boy: Remi
October 3 – Lupin III Part II
October 8 – Invincible Super Man Zambot 3
October 17 – Dinosaur War Izenborg
October 29 – Wakakusa no Charlotte
December 13 – Angie Girl
December 23 – Yakyū-kyō no Uta

1978
January 1 – The Story of Perrine
January 7 – Abarenbō Shōgun
March 6 – Majokko Tickle
March 14 – Space Pirate Captain Harlock
April 1 – Tōshō Daimos
April 2 – Starzinger
April 4 – Future Boy Conan
April 10 – Ikkyū-san 
May 17 – Spider-Man
June 3 – Haikara-san ga Tōru
June 3 – Invincible Steel Man Daitarn 3
July 4 – The Adventures of the Little Prince
September 14 – Galaxy Express 999
October 1 – Gatchaman II
October 3 – The Yagyu Conspiracy
October 8 – Treasure Island
October 14 – Shin Ace o Nerae!
October 14 – Space Battleship Yamato II
November 7 – Captain Future

1979
January 7 – Anne of Green Gables
February 3 – Zenderman
February 9 – Hana no Ko Lunlun
March 6 – Cyborg 009
March 21 – Mirai Robo Daltanious
April 2 – Doraemon
April 2 – Josephina the Whale
April 4 – The Ultraman
April 7 – Bannertail: The Story of Gray Squirrel
April 7 – Mobile Suit Gundam
April 14 – Shin Kyoujin no Hoshi II
September 9 – King Arthur
October 6 – Misha
October 7 – Gatchaman Fighter
October 7 – Gordian Warrior
October 9 – Manga Sarutobi Sasuke
October 10 – The Rose of Versailles
October 13 – Space Carrier Blue Noah

1980s

1980
January 6 – The Adventures of Tom Sawyer
January 7 – The Littl' Bits
January 8 – The Wonderful Adventures of Nils
January 9 – Maeterlinck's Blue Bird: Tyltyl and Mytyl's Adventurous Journey
February 2 – Invincible Robo Trider G7
February 2 – Rescueman
February 4 – Monchhichi Twins
February 15 – Lalabel
March 19 – Space Emperor God Sigma
April 6 – King Arthur: Prince on White Horse
April 7 – Tsurikichi Sanpei
April 15 – Zukkoke Knight - Don De La Mancha
May 8 – Space Runaway Ideon
June 30 – Space Warrior Baldios
July 12 – Magical Girl Lalabel: the Sea Calls for a Summer Vacation
July 16 – Ganbare Genki
September 2 – Kaibutsu-kun 2
September 7 – Muteking, The Dashing Warrior
September 28 – Ojamanga Yamada-kun
October 1 – Astro Boy
October 3 – Taiyō no Shisha Tetsujin Nijūhachi-gō
October 11 – Space Battleship Yamato III
October 13 – Ashita no Joe 2

1981
January 4 – The Swiss Family Robinson: Flone of the Mysterious Island
February 7 – Yattodetaman
March 1 – Golden Warrior Gold Lightan
March 4 – Beast King GoLion
March 6 – Hello! Sandybell
March 7 – Ohayō! Spank
April 3 – Ai no Gakko Cuore Monogatari
April 4 – Dotakon
April 7 – Belle and Sebastian
April 7 – Little Women
April 8 – Dr. Slump - Arale-chan
April 16 – Queen Millennia
April 20 – Tiger Mask II
July 3 – GoShogun
September 3 – Manga Mito Kōmon
September 7 – New Dokonjō Gaeru
September 28 – Ninja Hattori-kun
October 1 – Superbook
October 2 – Six God Combination Godmars
October 3 – Jarinko Chie
October 4 – Dash Kappei
October 6 – Galaxy Cyclone Braiger
October 7 – Honey Honey no Suteki na Bouken
October 8 – Miss Machiko
October 14 – Urusei Yatsura
October 23 – Fang of the Sun Dougram
 Sabu to Ichi Torimono Hikae

1982
January 10 – Lucy of the Southern Rainbow
January 25 – Asari-chan
February 6 – Combat Mecha Xabungle
February 13 – Gyakuten! Ippatsuman
March 3 – Armored Fleet Dairugger XV
March 18 – Magical Princess Minky Momo
April 5 – Don Dracula
April 5 – The Flying House
April 5 – Game Center Arashi
April 8 – Boku Patalliro!
April 17 – Thunderbirds 2086
May 5 – Acrobunch
May 8 – Little Pollon
June 29 – The Mysterious Cities of Gold
July 5 – The Kabocha Wine
July 6 – Galactic Gale Baxingar
October 3 – The Super Dimension Fortress Macross
October 7 – Space Cobra
October 7 – Robby the Rascal
October 7 – Tokimeki Tonight
October 10 –Warrior of Love Rainbowman
October 12 – The New Adventures of Maya the Honey Bee
October 13 – Arcadia of My Youth: Endless Orbit SSX

1983
January 9 – Mirai Keisatsu Urashiman
January 9 – Story of the Alps: My Annette
January 10 – Captain
February 5 – Aura Battler Dunbine
March 1 – Ai Shite Knight
March 26 – Fushigi no Kuni no Alice
March 30 – Lightspeed Electroid Albegas
March 31 – Miyuki
April 1 – Armored Trooper Votoms
April 2 – Nanako SOS
April 3 – Kinnikuman
April 3 – Mīmu Iro Iro Yume no Tabi
April 4 – Mrs. Pepper Pot
April 4 – Perman
April 4 – Superbook II
April 5 – Galactic Whirlwind Sasuraiger
April 7 – Eagle Sam
April 9 – Itadakiman
April 9 – Lady Georgie
May 20 – Stop!! Hibari-kun!
June 5 – Plawres Sanshiro
July 1 – Creamy Mami, the Magic Angel
July 1 – Serendipity the Pink Dragon
July 3 – Super Dimension Century Orguss
July 6 – Psycho Armor Govarian
July 11 – Cat's Eye
October 2 – Genesis Climber MOSPEADA
October 7 – Special Armored Battalion Dorvack
October 7 – Taotao
October 10 – Captain Tsubasa
October 18 – Chōshichirō Edo Nikki
October 20 – Igano Kabamaru
October 21 – Ginga Hyōryū Vifam

1984
February 3 – Chō Kōsoku Galvion
October 7 – Star Musketeer Bismark
October 8 – Cat's Eye
November 6 -"Sherlock Hound"

1985
April 1 – Shin Obake no Q-tarō
April 4 – Dancouga – Super Beast Machine God
April 8 – Bumpety Boo
July 15 – Dirty Pair: The Original TV Series
October 3 – Blue Comet SPT Layzner
October 12 – GeGeGe no Kitarō

1986
January 6 – Robotan
January 11 – Kato-chan Ken-chan Gokigen TV
February 26 – Dragon Ball
October 6 – Bosco Adventure

1987
August 31 – 8 Man Has Returned
October 1 – FNN Date Line
October 2 – Chibikko Kaiju Yadamon
October 4 – Norakuro-kun
October 12 – Oraa Guzura Dado

1988
January 9 – Himitsu no Akko-chan
February 13 – Osomatsu-kun
Ulysses 31

1989
March 18 – Osomatsu-kun: Suika no Hoshi Kara Konnichiwa Plaisance!
April 25 – Dragon Ball Z
October 3 – Downtown no Gaki no Tsukai ya Arahende!!
October 9 – Sally the Witch 2

1990s

1990
January 6 – Heisei Genius Bakabon
April 21 – Mōretsu Atarō

1991
November 2 – Marude Dameo
December 8 – Downtown no Gottsu Ee Kanji

1992
April 5 – Chōdendō Robo Tetsujin 28-go FX
October 15 – Calimero

1993
April 5 – Close-up Gendai
April 18 – Back to the Giatrus Days

1995
October 1 – Asayan

1996
January 7 – GeGeGe no Kitarō
February 7 – Dragon Ball GT
April 3 – First Human Gon
October 2 – Raideen the Superior

1997
January 7 – Bayside Shakedown
January 9 – Speed Racer
April 1 – Pokémon
April 17 – Dotch Cooking Show
July 19 – Flame of Recca

1998
April 5 – Himitsu no Akko-chan
April 7 – Cardcaptor Sakura

1999
January 31 – Moero!! Robocon
October 11 – Ainori
October 19 – Rerere no Tensai Bakabon

2000s

2000
July 1 – Food Fight
October 8 – Baby Felix

2001
April 21 – Ashita Ga Arusa
July 4 – Fighting Girl
October 6 – Babel II 2 - Beyond Infinity
October 14 – Cyborg 009: The Cyborg Soldier

2002
February 4 – Friends
April 4 – .hack//Sign
April 8 – Azumanga Daioh

2003
January 8 – .hack//Legend of the Twilight
April 15 – Baribari Value
October 4 – Chouseishin Gransazer

2004
January 15 – Aim for the Ace!
April 7 – Tetsujin 28-go
October 2 – Genseishin Justirisers
October 5 – Bleach

2005
January 13 – Fugo Keiji
March 28 – Evening 5
April 4 – Attack No. 1
April 10 – Aikurushii
April 15 – Doraemon
July 8 – Dragon Zakura
October 1 – Chousei Kantai Sazer-X
November 12 – Gaiking: Legend of Daiku-Maryu

2006
April 1 – Yōkai Ningen Bem
April 5 – .hack//Roots
October 5 – 009-1
October 5 – Code Geass: Lelouch of the Rebellion

2007
March 3 – Reideen
April 1 – GeGeGe no Kitarō

2008
January 10 – Hakaba Kitarō
January 14 – Yatterman
April 6 – Code Geass: Lelouch of the Rebellion R2
October 1 – AKBingo!

2009
April 5 – Dragon Ball Kai
September 5 – Jungle Taitei - Yūki ga Mirai wo Kaeru
October 12 - Fairy Tail
November 14 – Gaiji Keisatsu

2010s

2010
January 2 – Cobra the Animation: Rokunin no Yuushi
April 1 - Maid Sama!
April 17 – Kaibutsu-kun
July 5 – Asu no Hikari o Tsukame

2011
April 8 – Dororon Enma-kun Meeramera
April 17 – Blue Exorcist
October 22 – Yōkai Ningen Bem

2012
October 20 – World War Blue

2013
April 6 – Tetsujin 28-go Gao!

2014
July 5 – Aldnoah.Zero
July 6 – Akame ga Kill!
July 8 – Ai Mai Mi: Mousou Catastrophe
July 16 – ST Aka to Shirō no Sōsa File
October 2 – Binta! ~Bengoshi Jimuin Minowa ga Ai de Kaiketsushimasu~
October 2 – Denkigai no Honya-san
October 5 - World Trigger
October 6 – Ai Tenchi Muyo!
October 6 – When Supernatural Battles Became Commonplace
October 7 – Akatsuki no Yona
October 16 – Dear Sister
October 16 – Yuki Yuna is a Hero

2015
January 9 – Kaiki Renai Sakusen
January 10 - The Idolmaster Cinderella Girls
January 11 – Yoru no Yatterman
April 9 – Urawa no Usagi-chan
October 1 - Kami-sama Minarai: Himitsu no Cocotama
October 5 - One-Punch Man

2016
January 17 - Kazoku no Katachi
April 1 - Rage of Bahamut: Manaria Friends
April - Omukae desu
April - Sono 'Okodawari', Watashi ni mo Kure yo!!
July 4 - New Game!
July 9 - Ultraman Orb
October 1 - Bloodivores
October 5 - Cheating Craft
October 5 - To Be Hero
October 5 - Yuri on Ice
October 6 - Keijo!!!!!!!!

2017
January 5 - Seiren
January 10 - Kemono Friends
January 11 - Hand Shakers
January 12 - Chōyū Sekai
January - Tokyo Tarareba Musume
April 1 - The Silver Guardian
April - Boruto: Naruto Next Generations
April 8 - Eromanga Sensei

2018
April 6 - Magical Girl Site

TBA
Nyanko Days

See also
List of Chinese television programs by date

References

Lists of Japanese television series
Television in Japan by year